Hoseynabad (also Romanized as Ḩoseynābād) is a village in Sarpaniran Rural District, in the Central District of Pasargad County, Fars Province, Iran. At the 2006 census, its population was 144, in 37 families.

References 

Populated places in Pasargad County